Beddawi camp is a second camp in north Lebanon.   It is located in the high region which is in front of Tripoli city. It has two entrances, one southward from the Al-qobi region and the other northward from Beddawi city.  It was established in 1955 in 1 km2.  It is 120m above sea level and about 5 km north of Tripoli city.

Sectors
The camp is divided into four sectors:

Sector A
This contains 30% of the occupants.  Most of them are from Safad region, Shafaamer, Nahf, Safouri, Yafa, Yafa Badoun, Al-Ghabisiyya, Al-Safsf.

Sector B
This contains 20% of the occupants.  Most of them are from, Safad region, Al-Safsf, Sohmata,  Al- Brwih, Hayfa, Al- Bozih, Jahoula, Al- Naami.

Sector C
This contains 30% of the occupants.  Most of them are from, Safad region, Al- Bozih, Safouri, Hayfa region, Yafa, Khalesah.

Sector D
This contains 20%, distributed among 3 regions:

 PLO region: they are living in temporary houses and the occupants of these houses are displaced from Tel El- Zaater camp and south of Lebanon (Muhajarine).
 School region: they are from the same PLO region but the UNRWA has built new houses for them instead of temporary houses.
 Abo Naem buildings: they are living here for a temporary period because these buildings have an owner.

Other occupants
In Beddawi camp there are some people without identity or registration. They came in 1967 from West Bank, Gaza, Jordan, Egypt, Iraq.

Link
Beddawi camp, articles from UNRWA

Palestinian refugee camps in Lebanon